Suzi Shelton is a children's music recording artist who has been performing music for kids around her home base in New York City for the past 10 years.

Growing up in Chesterland, Ohio, Suzi studied early childhood education and dance.

Shelton's first CD, Simply Suzi, featured original songs about animals, dreams and dessert, and received a positive review from Children's Music Web, Parents’ Choice and the iParenting Media Awards. Shelton was the featured artist and host of a DVD series from Gymboree Play & Music.

References

Year of birth missing (living people)
Living people
American children's musicians
American acoustic guitarists
American women singers
American folk guitarists
American women guitarists
Guitarists from New York City
21st-century American women
Singer-songwriters from New York (state)